Otto Bulow was an architect from Sweden who worked in Pueblo, Colorado. He designed the Colorado Mineral Palace.

The Daily Chieftain listed him among a party visiting Manitou Springs, Colorado in May 1890. In 1887, he had a contract to supply 50,000 railroad ties to the Denver and Rio Grande Railway.

Works
Colorado Mineral Palace in Pueblo's Mineral Palace Park. Built in 1889, razed in 1942 but photographs remain and the El Pueblo Museum has a model of it
220 W. 3rd St.
Tooke-Nuckolls House (1891) at 38 Carlile Place, NRHP listed
Botanical and Horticultural Laboratory (1890) at Colorado Agricultural College in Fort Collins, NRHP listed
Beaumont Hotel (Ouray, Colorado) (1887) NRHP listed

References

Architects from Colorado
19th-century American architects
19th-century Swedish architects
People from Pueblo, Colorado